Salvador Sánchez Ponce (born 30 March 1991), commonly known as Salvi, is a Spanish professional footballer who plays for Rayo Vallecano as a right winger.

Career

Early career
Born in Sanlúcar de Barrameda, Cádiz, Andalusia, Salvi finished his graduation with Sevilla FC, making his senior debuts with the C-team on 27 April 2010 by coming on as a second-half substitute in a 2–1 Tercera División away loss against UD Los Barrios. In the 2010–11 campaign, he appeared in two matches for the reserves in Segunda División B, but resumed his spell at the club with the C's.

In the 2012 summer Salvi joined hometown club Atlético Sanluqueño CF, also in the third level. On 28 June 2014, after the club's relegation, he moved to fellow league team CF Villanovense.

Cádiz
On 5 July 2015, Salvi signed for Cádiz CF, still in the third division. He scored a career-best seven goals during the campaign, as his side returned to Segunda División after six years, and renewed his contract for four years on 9 August 2016.

Salvi made his professional debut on 19 August 2016, starting in a 1–1 away draw against UD Almería. He scored his first professional goal on 3 September, netting his team's second in a 3–2 loss at CD Mirandés.

On 5 November 2017, Salvi scored a brace in a 2–0 away defeat of Almería. Salvi became the top assist maker of Cádiz in 2019 with a total of eight assists, two of them in the matches of the 2018–19 season and six in the 2019–20 season.

On 27 September 2020, Salvi scored his debut goal in La Liga in the match against former club Sevilla.

Rayo Vallecano
On 1 July 2022, Salvi agreed to a two-year deal with Rayo Vallecano in the top tier.

Personal life
Salvi's younger brother Ezequiel is also a footballer. A right-back, he also represented Sanluqueño.

Career statistics

Club

References

External links

Salvi profile at Cadistas1910 

1991 births
Living people
Spanish footballers
Footballers from Andalusia
Association football wingers
La Liga players
Segunda División players
Segunda División B players
Tercera División players
Sevilla FC C players
Sevilla Atlético players
CF Villanovense players
Cádiz CF players
Rayo Vallecano players